Titan Stadium may refer to:

Titan Stadium (Cal State Fullerton) at the California State University, Fullerton
Titan Stadium (UW–Oshkosh), at the University of Wisconsin–Oskhosh
Nissan Stadium, the home of the Tennessee Titans American football team
Alternate name of University of Detroit Stadium, a former football stadium in Detroit